This is a list of English false friends in the constructed language Ido.

Words with different meaning

Ido words that have narrower meaning

Ido words that have broader meaning

External links
 Dyer's Ido-English dictionary

False friends
Ido language
English language